Soreq Nuclear Research Center is a research and development institute situated near the localities of Palmachim and Yavne in Israel. It operates under the auspices of the Israel Atomic Energy Commission (IAEC).

History
The center conducts research in various physical sciences, particularly the development of many kinds of sensors, lasers, atmospheric research, non-destructive testing techniques, space environment, nuclear safety, medical diagnostics and nuclear medicine. Soreq also produces various types of radiopharmaceuticals for use by health care organizations throughout the country.

Some of the institute's research facilities include an AMF 5 MW pool-type light water nuclear reactor supplied in the late 1950s from the United States under the Atoms for Peace program and a 10 MeV proton cyclotron accelerator, as well as extensive laboratory and testing facilities. Currently under construction is a 5-40 MeV, 0.04-5 mA proton and deuteron superconducting linear accelerator scheduled for commissioning in 2013.

The center is named after the nearby stream of Soreq.

The center operates under the safeguards of the International Atomic Energy Agency.

Architecture 
Noted American modernist architect Philip Johnson designed the center's building in 1956. The project was Johnson's first government commission. Dr. Lev Zetlin, the structural engineer for this project, introduced Philip Johnson to Israeli authorities and facilitated his hiring.  Zetlin, one of the most renowned practitioners of his profession, worked very closely with Johnson in the design and construction of the reactor.  It was Zetlin who set the parameters and established the conditions for the architect and turned Johnson's ideas into reality.

See also
SARAF – Soreq Applied Research Accelerator Facility

References

Oral History interview with Mr. Shraga Biran, June 21, 2018.

External links
Official website
Soreq Nuclear Research Center (SNRC), NTI
The Radiological Accident in Soreq, International Atomic Energy Agency, May 1993
Центр ядерных исследований «Сорек» 

Research institutes in Israel
Israeli nuclear development
Nuclear research institutes
Philip Johnson buildings